"A Beautiful Morning" is a song written by Felix Cavaliere and Eddie Brigati and recorded by the Rascals. Coming out in early 1968, it was the group's first track released after shortening their name from the Young Rascals. The single was one of the earliest released in stereo, as 7-inch singles generally were in mono. Together with the Doors "Hello, I Love You", it's credited with changing the industry standard of singles.

The song continued the theme of carefree optimism that had distinguished the previous year's "Groovin'". It was written one morning in Honolulu, Hawaii when the band was invited to perform there by promoter Tom Moffatt. It became a big hit in the United States, reaching number 3 on the Billboard Hot 100 chart, and also reaching number 36 on the Hot Rhythm & Blues Singles chart. It was RIAA-certified as a Million Seller on June 28, 1968. The first album on which the song appeared was Time Peace: The Rascals' Greatest Hits.

Chart performance

Weekly charts

Year-end charts

Other versions 
Renée Geyer covered the song on her album Dedicated (2007).

In other media 
The song is featured in a Scrubs episode, at the start of a season 6 episode with Zach Braff, who plays J.D., dancing to it. It was also featured at the end of a second-season episode of The Greatest American Hero, in which Ralph had to disarm a nuclear missile. It was also featured in the movie Kingpin immediately following the scene that shows how Roy got his rubber hand. 

The song was featured during the 1969 college graduation scene in The First Wives Club. It was also used in the 1993 movie A Bronx Tale opening the racetrack scene, as well as on Arrow at the end of the eighteenth episode of the fifth season, titled "Disbanded".

The song was also featured in season 3 episode 14 and season 5 episode 1 of The King of Queens. Sugar Pine 7 used it in the episode of the same name from their webseries Alternative Lifestyle in 2017.   The song's opening lines featured prominently in a 2002 TV commercial for the (since-recalled) pain reliever Vioxx, which opens with an idyllic clip of former Olympic champion figure skater Dorothy Hamill, skating on a pond amid bright sunshine.

References

External links
 [ Song Review] from Allmusic
 

1968 singles
The Rascals songs
Songs written by Felix Cavaliere
Songs written by Eddie Brigati
RPM Top Singles number-one singles
Atlantic Records singles
1967 songs